U-36 (S186) is a  Type 212A submarine of the German Navy. She is the sixth ship of the class to enter service.

She was laid down in August 2008 by Howaldtswerke, Kiel, launched in February 2013 and commissioned on 10 October 2016.  She is  under the patronage of the town of Plauen, in Saxony. The commissioning ceremony took place at Eckernförde in the presence of the Deputy Inspector of the Navy and Commander of the Fleet and Support Staff, Vice-Admiral Rainer Brinkmann, the Minister of the Interior and Federal Affairs of the State of Schleswig-Holstein, Stefan Studt, the head of the Schleswig-Holstein State Chancellery Thomas Losse-Müller, and the commander of Einsatzflottille 1 Jan Christian Kaack. U-36s first commander on commissioning was Korvettenkapitän Christoph Ploß.

Service 
U-36 is currently part of the 1st Ubootgeschwader, based in Eckernförde.  In January 2015 Der Spiegel reported that significant problems had been found with U-36 and her sister submarine U-35. The drive shaft system, battery, radar and the radio buoy were all found to be malfunctioning. In March 2015 U-36 began trials in the Kattegat off Kristiansand.

References 

Type 212 submarines of the German Navy
2013 ships
Submarines of Germany
Ships built in Kiel